Polis – The Jerusalem Institute of Languages and Humanities is a non-profit academic institution based in Jerusalem, Israel founded in 2011 which focuses on the humanities through the study of Western and Eastern cultural sources.

The institute is located in Musrara, near the Old City of Jerusalem. Students come from more than thirty countries from six continents.

History

Polis and its faculty have organized intensive language courses and as well as shorter seminars and talks in Italy, Peru, Argentina, the United States, Spain, Morocco, Finland, Sweden, and the Philippines.

The Polis Method

Theoretical Principles 
The 'Polis Method' encompasses a variety of approaches and techniques for teaching modern languages applied to ancient languages. These strategies are unified under two major tenets:

Dynamic language development 
Polis believes that grammatical structures must be learned according to their natural order of acquisition. It thus recognizes not only the student's continuous progression in language acquisition based on the four basic language skills of listening, speaking, reading and writing, but also the modes of discourse or literary genres – dialogue › narration › argumentation › poetry – involved in this progressive language acquisition.

Taking these principles into account, Polis puts together and adapts a wide range of approaches and teaching techniques that have been developed since the 70s in the States and Canada.

Practical Techniques

Living Sequential Expression (LSE) 
In the Polis LSE approach, students are presented with a series of sentences that express "sequences of logically connected actions" and they eventually understand the meaning of the sentences "by performing and then reporting on" the actions referred to.

Other activities and techniques 
Activities that require the use of language as one of its chief components can help a great deal in creating a more natural immersive experience. With this principle in mind, Polis encourages students to attend extra-class activities such as the full immersion lunches, where students and teachers dine together while speaking exclusively in the target language.

Academic programs

Third-party Master of Arts (MA) degrees

Master of Arts in Ancient Philology 
The Ancient Philology MA is dedicated to the study of both Ancient Greek and Biblical Hebrew. The MA degree in Ancient Philology is granted by either the Pontifical University of the Holy Cross in Rome or the International University of Catalonia in Barcelona.

Master of Arts in Near Eastern Languages 
The MA degree in Near Eastern Languages is granted by the University of Navarra in Pamplona.

Certificate programs

Certificates in language fluency 
Polis offers MA-level certificate programs in language fluency in Ancient Greek and Arabic.

Other programs

Summer programs and international programs 
In the summer, Polis offers several intensive language courses, both in Jerusalem and abroad. Courses in Ancient Greek, Biblical Hebrew, Latin, Modern Standard Arabic and Methods in Teaching Ancient Languages have been held in Rome, Italy and the US Venues have included the Pontifical University of the Holy Cross in Rome, Christendom College in Virginia, Wisconsin, Ave Maria University in Florida, Bridgewater State University in Massachusetts, and the University of Kentucky in Lexington, Kentucky. In the Polis Institute itself, during the summer, in addition to the language courses already mentioned, Classical Syriac and Spoken Arabic are likewise taught.

Language courses 
In the regular school year (October – February) Polis teaches ancient and modern language courses. Ancient languages include Ancient Greek, Biblical Hebrew, Latin, Classical Syriac, and Bohairic Coptic. Modern languages include Modern Hebrew (Ulpan), Spoken Arabic, and Modern Standard Arabic. In the past Sumerian was also taught.

See also
Education in Israel

References

External links
 Polis – The Jerusalem Institute of Languages and Humanities

Coordinates on Wikidata
Philology
Non-profit organizations based in Israel
Research institutes in Israel